The Bailey–Thompson House is a registered historic building in Georgetown, Ohio, listed in the National Register on 1976-11-07.

Historic uses 
Single Dwelling

Notes 

National Register of Historic Places in Brown County, Ohio
Houses on the National Register of Historic Places in Ohio
Houses in Brown County, Ohio